Treston Thomison is an American mixed martial artist currently competing in the Featherweight division of Bellator MMA. A professional competitor since 2009, he has also competed for King of the Cage.

Mixed martial arts record

|-
| Loss
| align=center| 10–6
| Justin Lawrence
| TKO (doctor stoppage)
| Bellator 181
| 
| align=center| 1
| align=center| 3:34
| Thackerville, Oklahoma, United States
|Return to Featherweight.
|-
| Loss
| align=center| 10–5
| Emmanuel Rivera
| Decision (unanimous)
| Bellator 174
| 
| align=center| 3
| align=center| 5:00
| Thackerville, Oklahoma, United States
|Catchweight (151 lbs) bout.
|-
| Win
| align=center| 10–4
| Dawond Pickney
| Submission (armbar)
| Bellator 166
| 
| align=center| 1
| align=center| 0:51
| Thackerville, Oklahoma, United States
|Lightweight debut.
|-
| Win
| align=center| 9–4
| Aaron Roberson
| Submission (guillotine choke)
| Bellator 151
| 
| align=center| 2
| align=center| 2:20
| Thackerville, Oklahoma, United States
|
|-
| Loss
| align=center| 8–4 
| Chris Jones
| Decision (unanimous)
| Bellator 146
| 
| align=center| 3
| align=center| 5:00
| Thackerville, Oklahoma, United States
|Catchweight (150 lbs) bout.
|-
| Loss
| align=center| 8-3
| Cody Walker
| KO (head kick)
| Bellator 128
| 
| align=center| 2
| align=center| 4:59
| Thackerville, Oklahoma, United States
| 
|-
| Win
| align=center| 8-2
| Stephen Banaszak
| Submission (guillotine choke)
| Bellator 121
| 
| align=center| 1
| align=center| N/A
| Thackerville, Oklahoma, United States
| 
|-
| Loss
| align=center| 7-2
| Stephen Banaszak
| Submission (armbar)
| Bellator CXIX
| 
| align=center| 1
| align=center| 4:56
| Rama, Ontario, Canada
| 
|-
| Win
| align=center| 7-1
| Jade Porter
| Submission (armbar)
| KOTC: Regulators
| 
| align=center| 1
| align=center| 0:18
| Scottsdale, Arizona, United States
| 
|-
| Win
| align=center| 6-1
| Daniel Armendariz
| KO (punch)
| KOTC: Aerial Assault
| 
| align=center| 1
| align=center| 0:31
| Thackerville, Oklahoma, United States
| 
|-
| Win
| align=center| 5-1
| Brian Joseph
| Submission (armbar)
| KOTC: Bad Intentions II
| 
| align=center| 1
| align=center| 1:51
| Thackerville, Oklahoma, United States
| 
|-
| Loss
| align=center| 4-1
| Mike Maldonado
| KO (punches)
| KOTC: Total Destruction
| 
| align=center| 1
| align=center| 0:31
| Thackerville, Oklahoma, United States
| 
|-
| Win
| align=center| 4-0
| Anthony Kellen
| Decision (split)
| KOTC: Apocalypse
| 
| align=center| 3
| align=center| 5:00
| Thackerville, Oklahoma, United States
| 
|-
| Win
| align=center| 3-0
| Scott Bear
| Submission (rear-naked choke)
| KOTC: Epic Force
| 
| align=center| 1
| align=center| 1:18
| Thackerville, Oklahoma, United States
| 
|-
| Win
| align=center| 2-0
| Cris Leyva
| Submission (armbar)
| KOTC: Underground 67
| 
| align=center| 1
| align=center| 2:13
| Cortez, Colorado, United States
| 
|-
| Win
| align=center| 1-0
| Kyle Waag
| Submission
| FCF: Freestyle Cage Fighting 43
| 
| align=center| 1
| align=center| 0:29
| Claremore, Oklahoma, United States
|

Mixed martial arts amateur record

|-
| Win
| align=center| 4-0
| Charles Anderson
| Submission (rear-naked choke)
| FCF: Freestyle Cage Fighting 39
| 
| align=center| 1
| align=center| 0:20
| Shawnee, Oklahoma, United States
| 
|-
| Win
| align=center| 3-0
| Robert Pickle
| Submission
| FCF: Freestyle Cage Fighting 33
| 
| align=center| 3
| align=center| 0:27
| Durant, Oklahoma, United States
| 
|-
| Win
| align=center| 2-0
| Steven Tackett
| Submission (armbar)
| FCF: Freestyle Cage Fighting 31
| 
| align=center| 1
| align=center| 1:01
| Tulsa, Oklahoma, United States
| 
|-
| Win
| align=center| 1-0
| Charles Evans
| Submission (rear-naked choke)
| FCF: Freestyle Cage Fighting 30
| 
| align=center| 1
| align=center| 0:20
| Shawnee, Oklahoma, United States
|

See also
List of male mixed martial artists

References

External links
 

American male mixed martial artists
Featherweight mixed martial artists
Lightweight mixed martial artists
Living people
Year of birth missing (living people)